Arcadia Lake may refer to:

Arcadia Lake (Oklahoma), a lake in Oklahoma County, Oklahoma, USA
Arcadia Lake (Michigan), a lake in Manistee County, Michigan, USA

See also
Arcadia Lakes, South Carolina, a town